Gene Luen Yang (Chinese Traditional: 楊謹倫, Simplified: 杨谨伦, Pinyin: Yáng Jǐnlún; born August 9, 1973) is an American cartoonist. He is a frequent lecturer on the subjects of graphic novels and comics, at comic book conventions and universities, schools, and libraries. In addition, he was the Director of Information Services and taught computer science at Bishop O'Dowd High School in Oakland, California. In 2012, Yang joined the faculty at Hamline University, as a part of the Low-Residency Master of Fine Arts in Writing for Children and Young Adults (MFAC) program. In 2016, the U.S. Library of Congress named him Ambassador for Young People's Literature. That year he became the third graphic novelist, alongside Lauren Redniss, to receive a MacArthur Fellowship.

Early life
Yang believes he was born in either Alameda or Fremont, California. He is the child of an electrical engineer from Taiwan and a programmer who grew up in Hong Kong and Taiwan, both of whom emigrated to the United States. They met at the San Jose State University Library during graduate school. His parents instilled in him a strong work ethic and reinforced their Asian culture. In a speech at Penn State, where he spoke as a part of a Graphic Novel Speaker Series, Yang recalled that both of his parents always told him stories during his childhood.

Yang was a part of a small Asian-American minority in his elementary school. He grew up wanting to be an animator for Disney. In third grade, he did a biographical report on Walt Disney, which is where he says his obsession started. This changed in fifth grade when his mother took him to their local bookstore where she bought him his first comic book, issue 57 of the Superman series DC Comics Presents, a book she agreed to buy because Yang's first choice, Marvel Two-in-One issue 99, featured the characters Thing and Rom on the cover, which she thought looked too frightening.

Yang attended the University of California, Berkeley for his undergraduate degree. He wanted to major in art but his father encouraged him to pursue a more "practical" field so Yang majored in computer science with a minor in creative writing. In college Yang found himself much less of a minority. During this time, he began to question his faith, but a moment he experienced while walking through the woods during his freshman year caused him to make Jesus his life's focus.

Career
After graduating in 1995, Yang worked as a computer engineer for two years. However, after a five-day silent retreat, he felt he was meant to teach, and left his job as a computer engineer to teach computer science at a high school. In 1996, Yang began self-publishing his own comics under the imprint Humble Comics. Yang went on to be published with First Second Books (an imprint of Macmillan Publishers), Marvel Comics, SLG Publishing, Dark Horse Comics, HarperTeen, The New Press, and Pauline Books & Media.

In 1997, Yang first published comic Gordon Yamamoto and the King of the Geeks under his Humble Comics imprint, and it won him the Xeric Grant, a self-publishing grant for comic book creators. Yang later published two more installments in the Gordon Yamamoto mini-series and a sequel, Loyola Chin and the San Peligran Order. In 2010, both Gordon Yamamoto and the King of the Geeks series and Loyola Chin and the San Pelgrino Order were published together as Animal Crackers by Slave Labor Graphics. 

In 2006, Yang published American Born Chinese with First Second Publishing. Drawing upon the Chinese folk character of the trickster Monkey King, the book tells the story of a school-age second-generation immigrant who struggles with his Chinese-American identity. Although Yang drew from his own experiences, the book is not autobiographical. In 2021 Disney+ ordered production of a television adaptation of the book.

Yang's other works have been recognized as well. In 2009, Yang was awarded another Eisner Award for Best Short Story for his collaborative work The Eternal Smile which he wrote and Derek Kirk Kim illustrated. Yang was nominated for Eisner Awards for both Prime Baby and his collaborative work Level Up.

Yang wrote the Avatar: The Last Airbender comics series for Dark Horse Comics, the first volume of which was released in January 2012. Yang's graphic novel, Boxers & Saints, which was published by First Second Books in September 2013. In July 2016, DC Comics released the first issue of New Super-Man, featuring a separate Chinese character in the Superman mold, written by Yang and drawn by Viktor Bogdanovic. In October 2019, Yang created a limited series, Superman Smashes the Klan, a loose adaptation of a famous 1946 story-arc from The Adventures of Superman radio series, "Clan of the Fiery Cross", in which an Asian-American family is threatened by the Ku Klux Klan and a young and unsure Superman is determined to protect the children from the terrorists. Making his Marvel Comics debut in 2020, Yang wrote a miniseries starring the martial arts superhero Shang-Chi. According to Yang, the series explores the relationship between Shang-Chi and his archenemy father Zheng Zu, who was originally the infamous villain Fu Manchu. In May 2021, in celebration of the Asian Pacific American Heritage Month, DC Comics launched the hero Monkey Prince, created by Yang and Bernard Chang. 

Yang advocates the use of comics and graphic novels as educational tools in the classroom. In his final project for his master's degree at California State University, East Bay, he emphasized the educational strength of comics, claiming they are motivating, visual, permanent, intermediary, and popular. As a part of his Master's project, Yang created an online comic called Factoring with Mr. Yang & Mosley the Alien as a method of teaching math. This idea came from a time where Yang was substitute teaching a math class at Bishop O'Dowd. Due to the position of Director of Information Services he held at the school, he was forced to miss classes and used the comics to help the students learn the concepts in his absence. Positive student feedback inspired him to use the idea for his Master's project.

In 2018, Yang joined the board of directors of the Comic Book Legal Defense Fund, a non-profit organization founded in 1986 chartered to protect the First Amendment rights of the comics community.

Awards and recognition
American Born Chinese won the annual Michael L. Printz Award from the American Library Association, which recognizes the year's "best book written for teens, based entirely on its literary merit". It was the first graphic novel to be a finalist for the National Book Award, Young People's Literature, and won an Eisner Award for best new graphic album. It has been on the Booklist top Ten Graphic Novel for Youth; NPR Holiday Pick, Publishers Weekly Comics Week Best Comic of the Year, San Francisco Chronicle Best Book of the Year, the National Cartoonists Society Award for Best Comic Book, the Chinese American Librarians Association 2006/2007 Best Graphic Album – New, Time Top Ten Comic of the Year, and Amazon.com Best Graphic Novel/Comic of the year. 

In January 2016, Yang began serving a two-year term as National Ambassador for Young People's Literature, a program organized by the Children's Book Council, Every Child a Reader, and the Center for the Book in the Library of Congress.

Yang was named to the 2016 class of the MacArthur Fellows Program, receiving what is commonly called the "Genius Grant". The MacArthur Foundation that names the fellows said that his "work for young adults demonstrates the potential of comics to broaden our understanding of diverse cultures and people."

In 2020, Yang won two Harvey Awards for his works: Dragon Hoops for Book of the Year and Superman Smashes the Klan for Best Children or Young Adult Book. At the 2021 Eisner Awards, Superman Smashes the Klan won both Best Publication for Kids and Best Adaptation from Another Medium while Dragon Hoops won Best Publication for Teens.

Selected works
The Rosary Comic Book (Pauline Books & Media, 2003) A graphic novel telling of the stories behind the mysteries of the Catholic rosary in which each panel represents one of the prayers.
Animal Crackers (SLG Publishing, 2004) Featuring Gordon Yamamoto and the King of the Geeks and Loyola Chin and the San Peligran Order.
American Born Chinese (First Second Books, 2006)
The Eternal Smile (First Second Books, 2009). A collection of three short stories.
Prime Baby (First Second Books, 2010) Thaddeus is upset to discover that not only is his baby sister (whom he hates) an inter-dimensional conduit for peace-loving aliens, but that nobody will believe him.
Level Up (First Second Books, 2011) Dennis Ouyang's parents expect him to go to medical school instead of becoming a professional gamer. He finds himself trapped on the path to medical school by four angels and must find a way out.
Avatar: The Last Airbender, illustrated by Gurihiru (Dark Horse Comics, 2012–2017):
The Promise (Dark Horse Comics, 2012)
The Search (Dark Horse Comics, 2013)
The Rift (Dark Horse Comics, 2014)
Smoke and Shadow (Dark Horse Comics, 2016)
North and South (Dark Horse Comics, 2017)
Boxers and Saints (First Second Books, 2013), Two novels set during the Boxer Uprising, Boxers describes the "bands of foreign missionaries and soldiers" who "roam the countryside bullying and robbing Chinese peasants". Little Bao, "harnessing the powers of ancient Chinese gods", recruits an army of Boxers, "commoners trained in kung fu who fight to free China from 'foreign devils. Saints concerns an unwanted and unwelcome fourth daughter, Four-Girl, who finally finds friendship in Christianity. But bands of young men roam the countryside, murdering Westerners and Chinese Christians alike. She will have to decide whether she is willing to die for her faith. Boxers and Saints won the 2013 Los Angeles Times Book Prize for Young Adult Literature, was nominated for the 2014 Ignatz Award for Outstanding Graphic Novel, and was a 2013 National Book Award finalist.
The Shadow Hero, illustrated by Sonny Liew (First Second Books, 2014) An origin story for the obscure Golden-Age comic book hero The Green Turtle, who is thought to be the first Asian-American superhero.
Superman Vol.3 #41–50, illustrated by John Romita Jr. and Klaus Janson (DC Comics, 2015–2016)
Secret Coders, illustrated by Mike Holmes (First Second, 2015–)
Secret Coders, 2015
Paths & Portals, 2016
Secrets & Sequences, 2017
Robots & Repeats, 2017
Potions & Parameters, 2018
Monsters & Modules, 2018
New Super-Man #1-18, series about a Chinese Superman, Kong Kenan (DC Comics, 2016–2018)
New Super-Man and the Justice League of China, the series concludes the adventures of Kong Kenan and the other Chinese heroes (DC Comics, 2018)
Free Comic Book Day: Fresh Off the Boat #1 (Boom! Comics, 2017)
Superman Smashes the Klan (DC Comics, 2019-2020)
The Terrifics #15-30 (DC Comics, 2019-2020)
Dragon Hoops (First Second Books, 2020)
Shang-Chi (Marvel Comics, 2020-2022)
Batman/Superman #16-22 (DC Comics, 2021)
Monkey Prince (DC Comics, 2021-present)
Shang-Chi and the Ten Rings (Marvel Comics, 2022)
Shang-Chi: Master of the Ten Rings (Marvel Comics, 2023)
Lazarus Planet (DC Comics, 2023)
Lazarus Planet: Alpha, 2023
Lazarus Planet: Omega, 2023

Anthologies
Up All Night (Harper Collins) – 14-page short story
Secret Identities (The New Press) – 12-page short story
Strange Tales II (Marvel Comics) – 4-page short story
Nursery Rhyme Comics (First Second Books) – 1-page short story
Shattered (The New Press) – 4-page short story
Open Mic (Candlewick) – 4-page short story
Comic Squad: Recess! (Random House) – 12-page short story

See also

References

External links

 
 
 
 
 
 
 
 
 
 

 

1973 births
Alternative cartoonists
American comics artists
American education writers
American people of Hong Kong descent
American people of Taiwanese descent
Artists from the San Francisco Bay Area
Educators from California
Michael L. Printz Award winners
Hamline University faculty
People from Alameda, California
Writers from the San Francisco Bay Area
Living people
American writers of Chinese descent
American graphic novelists
American male novelists
California State University, East Bay alumni
Novelists from Minnesota
MacArthur Fellows
American male non-fiction writers
Eisner Award winners
Eisner Award winners for Best Writer
Harvey Award winners
Marvel Comics writers